Bengt Ohlson, (born 10 March 1943), is a Swedish former ice hockey player and manager. acting as the head coach for the Swedish national team during the 1980–1981 season where Sweden won the silver medal during the 1981 IIHF World Championship following an otherwise weak season but resigned after being threatened to death.

Winning the silver medal, he became popularly known as "Silverfisken" by the Swedes, after being called "Torsken" following the Swedish fiasco during the 1980 Izvestia Tournament.

References

External links
 

1963 births
Living people
Swedish ice hockey managers
Swedish ice hockey players